Pampatheriidae ("Pampas beasts") is an extinct family of large plantigrade armored armadillos related to extant armadillos in the order Cingulata. However, pampatheriids have existed as a separate lineage since at least the middle Eocene Mustersan age, . Pampatheres evolved in South America during its long period of Cenozoic isolation. Although widespread, they were less diverse and abundant than the armadillos. Holmesina spread to North America after the formation of the Isthmus of Panama as part of the Great American Interchange. They finally disappeared on both continents in the end-Pleistocene extinctions, about 12,000 years ago.

Description 
Like three-banded armadillos, and unlike glyptodonts, their armored shell was given some flexibility by three movable lateral bands of scutes. The osteoderms (bony plates in the skin comprising the armor) of pampatheres were each covered by a single keratinized scute, unlike osteoderms of armadillos, which have more than one scute.

A study of pampathere jaw biomechanics showed that their masticatory musculature was more powerful and more adapted for transverse movements than that of armadillos, leading to the conclusion that much of their diet was coarse vegetation. They are thought to have been primarily grazers, unlike armadillos, which are omnivorous or insectivorous. The variation between species in the expression of adaptations for grinding coarse vegetation correlates with the aridity of their habitat; such adaptations are most pronounced in Pampatherium typum, which lived in the arid Pampas, and least pronounced in Holmesina occidentalis, which lived in humid lowlands.

References

External links 
 Paleodatabase

†
Prehistoric cingulates
 
 
 
Oligocene first appearances
Holocene extinctions
Paleogene mammals of South America
Neogene mammals of South America
Pleistocene mammals of South America
Pleistocene mammals of North America
Prehistoric mammal families